Jackson Hole Preserve, Incorporated is non-profit conservation organization whose primary mission is the conservation ethic applied to natural areas.

History
The Jackson Hole Preserve organization was founded in 1940 by Laurance Rockefeller. In 1943 it protected land, now in Grand Teton National Park, as a nature preserve originally known as the Jackson Hole Preserve and later the Jackson Hole Wildlife Park.

Laurance Rockefeller also purchased and donated  of land on Saint John island in the United States Virgin Islands, to the U.S. National Park Service to create Virgin Islands National Park.

See also
 Rockefeller Foundation

References

External links
 NPS.gov: Grand Teton National Park — History of the Jackson Hole Preserve & Jackson Hole Wildlife Park

Conservation and environmental foundations in the United States
Rockefeller Foundation
Environmental organizations based in Wyoming
Environmental organizations established in 1940
1940 establishments in the United States
1940s in Wyoming
Grand Teton National Park